Antoni Macierewicz (born 3 August 1948) is a Polish politician and the former Minister of National Defence. He previously served as the Minister of Internal Affairs, Head of the Military Counterintelligence Service, and Minister of State in the Ministry of National Defence.

Employing nonviolent civil disobedience, Macierewicz was one of the founders in 1976 of the Workers' Defense Committee, a major anti-communist opposition organization that was a forerunner of Solidarity. During the 1980s Macierewicz directed the Centre for Social Research of Solidarity and was one of the trade union's key advisors. A former political prisoner, he escaped from incarceration and was in hiding until 1984, directing work and issuing underground publications.

Macierewicz served as the Minister of Internal Affairs from 1991 to 1992, the Head of the Military Counterintelligence Service from 2006 to 2007, and the Minister of National Defence from 2015 to 2018. He is currently in his sixth term in the Parliament of Poland, where he represents the Piotrków Trybunalski district, and was a Member of the European Parliament. He is also the Deputy Leader of Law and Justice, the largest party in the Parliament of Poland.

Early life
Macierewicz was born in Warsaw on 3 August 1948. He is the youngest of three children of Zdzisław and Maria Macierewicz, both scientists. His father, a noted researcher in chemistry, a soldier in the Home Army during World War II, and a member of the Christian democratic Labor Party, committed suicide in 1949.

Anti-communist activities
Macierewicz was expelled from Andrzej Frycz Modrzewski High School for political reasons in 1965, specifically for refusing to denounce the Letter of Reconciliation of the Polish Bishops to the German Bishops. Macierewicz continued his studies at Maria Konopnicka High School. From 1966, he belonged to the Czarna Jedynka scout troop. After completing his baccalaureate exams, he became a student at the University of Warsaw in 1966. He co-organized underground student organizations and participated in the student strikes that marked the 1968 Polish political crisis. He was arrested and remained a political prisoner from 28 March to 3 August 1968. Following the Polish 1970 protests, Macierewicz launched the campaign to help victims of state oppression. In 1971 he earned a master's degree from the Institute of History of the University of Warsaw. His thesis was titled Hierarchy of Power and the Structure of Land Ownership in Tawantinsuyu in the First Half of the Sixteenth Century’’.

As a doctoral student at the Institute of History of the Polish Academy of Sciences, he developed expertise on South America, but his doctoral thesis was not considered for political reasons. Subsequently, he coordinated with other independent intellectuals, writing letters of protest to the government regarding changes in the constitution of the Polish People's Republic. He taught the history of Latin America at the Department of Iberian Studies of the University of Warsaw. During this time he published articles and learned Quechuan languages. In January 1976, he started a PhD under the supervision of Tadeusz Łepkowski, which was interrupted by the authorities in mid-October 1976 because of Macierewicz’s dissident activities. Moreover, publication of his book and a trip to Argentina in order to conduct archival research were both blocked.

After the pacification of workers in June 1976, he organized relief in Radom and Ursus. Along with some of his colleagues from "Black One", he created underground structures, which dealt with the monetary, legal, and medical aid for the oppressed. Macierewicz founded the Workers' Defence Committee (KOR), the forerunner of Solidarity. “Macierewicz, more than anyone else, was responsible for the formation of KOR”, notes David Ost, a Professor of Political Science at Hobart and William Smith Colleges.

In September 1976 he co-authored the organization's first appeal and began publishing the Komunikat „KOR”, working closely with Piotr Naimski and Jan Olszewski. From 16 May to 23 July 1977, and again in December 1979, Macierewicz was held as a political prisoner. In 1977 he started Głos, one of the first magazines of the democratic opposition in the communist era. In October 1979 he was a member of the Solidarity hunger strike at the Holy Cross Church in Warsaw. In connection with his opposition activities, he was kept under surveillance by the security services of communist Poland and, from 1976 until 1980, he was detained at least 23 times and his residence regularly searched.

From September 1980, Macierewicz directed the Centre for Social Research of Solidarity. He also began to publish the independent newspaper News Day Warsaw. Since October 1980 he was a member of the National Coordination Committee of Advisors, and later the National Commission of Solidarity. On 27 September 1981 Macierewicz was one of the signatories of the founding declaration of Independence Service Clubs. In the autumn of 1981, he joined the faculty at the Jagiellonian University. After the introduction of martial law in Poland, Macierewicz was part of the strike committee at the Gdańsk Shipyard. After the pacification of the protest of 16 December 1981, he was arrested but escaped from prison. Macierewicz was in hiding until 1984, directing work and issuing underground publications.

Political career
Member of the Sejm
Macierewicz remains a Member of the Sejm, where he has served from 25 November 1991 to 31 May 1993, from 20 October 1997 to 18 October 2005 and from 5 November 2007 to present. He represents the Piotrków Trybunalski district. He is the Chairman of the Parliamentary Committee for the Investigation of the Causes of the 2010 Polish Air Force Tu-154 Crash. Macierewicz is also a member of the National Defense Commission and the Subcommission for the Polish Defense Industry and Technical Modernization of the Armed Forces.

Minister of Internal Affairs
He was Minister of Internal Affairs in Jan Olszewski's government. As a minister responsible for the police and security services, he was afforded full access to the former communist documentary archives, including records of communist intelligence and secret service agents. On 28 May 1992 the Parliament of Poland passed a law that the Minister of Internal Affairs had to provide the Sejm with a list of then senators, representatives, ministers, voivodes, judges and prosecutors who had been secret communist agents between 1945 and 1990. On 4 June 1992, Macierewicz provided a list, commonly known as the Macierewicz List, of 64 members of the government and parliament that had been identified as secret agents in the archives of the communist secret police to the Convent of Senior Parliamentarians. He also provided a second list containing the two names of highest importance, that of than President Lech Wałęsa and Marshall of Sejm Wiesław Chrzanowski.

As the crisis had been unfolding, prior to the lists' presentation, on 29 May 1992, the opposition parties submitted a motion of no confidence, asking for a vote on the fate of Olszewski's government. On the night of 4 June 1992, after the presentation of the lists, the motion of no confidence passed and Olszewski's government was dismissed. This situation was depicted in a documentary film, Nocna zmiana.

Activity between government posts
In 1993 Macierewicz founded his own party, Polish Action. He joined Olszewski's party, the Movement for Reconstruction of Poland, and became his deputy in 1996. He ran for parliament on Olszewski's party ticket. In 1997 he founded the Catholic-National Movement. In 2001 he joined the League of Polish Families, and on its list was re-elected to parliament in 2001, but left them due to policy differences. In 2002 Macierewicz ran unsuccessfully for President of Warsaw.

Member of the European Parliament
Macierewicz was a Member of the European Parliament during the fifth term. He served on the Committee on Development and Cooperation.

Secretary of State in the Ministry of National Defence

Following the 2005 Polish parliamentary election, Macierewicz was selected by Prime Minister Jarosław Kaczyński for the post of Secretary of State in the Ministry of National Defence.

Chairman of the Verification Commission

In July 2006, Macierewicz was appointed as the Chairman of the Verification Commission. He led the liquidation of the Military Information Services (WSI), an alleged "vestige of the communist era." Macierewicz also established new intelligence and counterintelligence agencies. On 16 February 2007 the closure report, known as the Macierewicz Report, was published in the Polish Monitor. 

In its analysis, global intelligence company Stratfor noted:

The report contained list of members of the WSI (military intelligence service), which included dozens of current and former Polish military counterintelligence contacts, some active in highly sensitive places like Afghanistan. Polish ambassadors to Austria, China, Kuwait and Turkey were recalled to Warsaw. At least ten of the names, including the military attaché in Moscow, were fiercely contested.

Head of the Military Counterintelligence Service
In October 2006, Macierewicz became Head of the Military Counterintelligence Service, in office until the end of the Kaczyński government.

Polish Air Force Tu-154 crash investigation

Since 20 July 2010 Macierewicz is the Chairman of the Parliamentary Committee for the Investigation of the Causes of the 2010 Polish Air Force Tu-154 crash, commonly known as the Macierewicz Commission. The crash, which killed President of Poland Lech Kaczyński and his wife Maria, and 94 other dignitaries en route to the 70th anniversary commemorations of the Katyń massacre, has already been analyzed and documented by Committee for Investigation of National Aviation Accidents.  Since the first days after the crash, Macierewicz claimed the crash was an assassination.  Established on 8 July 2010, the goal of Macierewicz Commission was to disprove the official report.  As the state investigation moved to exhumation of President Kaczyński's and others' bodies in late 2016, the New York Times summarized that "Macierewicz claimed over the years to have 'irrefutable evidence' of explosives [having caused the crash, but] his experts have yet to produce it."

Deputy Leader of Law and Justice
Since 23 November 2013 Macierewicz has been the Deputy Leader of Law and Justice, the largest party in the Parliament of Poland.

Minister of National Defence

Macierewicz paid an official visit to Israel in April 2016. Macierewicz and Israeli Defense Minister Moshe Ya'alon pledged to strengthened military cooperation between Poland and Israel. Macierewicz was criticized in the Polish press during the 2016 Warsaw summit for his support of the defense industry of Israel. In October 2016 Macierewicz was condemned by Gazeta Wyborcza for his association with a leading champion of the fight to restore assets from Swiss banks to Holocaust survivors.

Honors and awards
On 3 May 1990, Ryszard Kaczorowski, then President of Poland in exile, awarded Macierewicz the Order of Polonia Restituta, one of Poland's highest orders. News magazine Gazeta Polska'' named Macierewicz the 2010 Man of the Year.

On 23 September 2022 Macierewicz was awarded the Order of the White Eagle, the highest state decoration.

Controversies

Following Macierewicz's designation as Minister of National Defence, he faced allegations of anti-Semitism and protests by the Anti Defamation League. In 1996, Macierewicz wrote that Poles did not murder Jews in the Kielce pogrom in 1946. In 2001, Macierewicz wrote: "Is the hubbub surrounding Jedwabne intended to eclipse the responsibility of Jews for Communism and the Soviet occupation?"

In a radio interview in 2002 Macierewicz said, in response to a caller's question, that he had read the Protocols of the Elders of Zion, and that while there are doubts on authenticity that "Experience shows that there are such groups in Jewish circles." The statement was condemned by the Jewish community in Poland. According to, Krzysztof Izdebski, the Chairman of the Council of The Union of Jewish Communities, Macierewicz apologized for the statement and "accepts with no doubts that the Protocols is false" which was accepted by the council. Justin Schulberg, a Jewish American former legislative assistant to Macierewicz and a student leader at Rutgers University, stated, “As a Jewish American, I am outraged by false and outlandish rumors and innuendos accusing Antoni Macierewicz, Poland’s Minister of National Defence-designate, of antisemitism… I hope that all factions in Poland will forcefully condemn the use of Judaism for political infighting.” Anna Chipczynska, the President of the Jewish Community of Warsaw, said, "the latest statement by Mr. Macierewicz denouncing all forms of anti-Semitism could be a positive signal that the new Polish government will stand strongly against manifestations of hatred toward Jews."

In July 2016, Antoni Macierewicz said that the "real enemy", Russia, shares responsibility for the massacres of Poles and Jews in German-occupied Volhynia and Eastern Galicia by the Ukrainian Insurgent Army (UPA). Russian Foreign Ministry spokeswoman Maria Zakharova said that "the Polish government is moving from Russophobia to inciting national hatred," and asked Macierewicz if "there are any historical events and natural disasters for which Russia is not the one to blame." Macierewicz's claim was also criticized by the Federation of Jewish Communities of Russia.

In the comical webseries The Chairman's Ear (2017), implicit references are made to an alleged homosexual relationship between "Minister of War" Antoni and a younger man. This pun refers to Macierewicz's close ties with the much younger politician Bartłomiej Misiewicz (born in 1990).

Footnotes

External links
 
 Parliamentary profile

|-

|-

|-

|-

|-

|-

1948 births
Living people
Polish Scouts and Guides
University of Warsaw alumni
Historians of Latin America
20th-century Polish historians
Polish male non-fiction writers
Academic staff of Jagiellonian University
Academic staff of the University of Warsaw
Interior ministers of Poland
Ministers of National Defence of Poland
Politicians from Warsaw
Christian National Union politicians
Law and Justice politicians
Members of the Workers' Defence Committee
Movement for Reconstruction of Poland politicians
Nonviolence advocates
Polish anti-communists
Polish democracy activists
Polish dissidents
Polish trade unionists
Polish Roman Catholics
Roman Catholic activists
20th-century Roman Catholics
21st-century Roman Catholics
Politicians of Catholic political parties
Solidarity (Polish trade union) activists
MEPs for Poland 2004
Polish opinion journalists
Members of the Polish Sejm 2007–2011
Members of the Polish Sejm 2011–2015
Members of the Polish Sejm 2015–2019
Members of the Polish Sejm 2019–2023